The 1971 Hong Kong Urban Council election was held on 3 March 1971 for the five of the ten elected seats of the Urban Council of Hong Kong. 10,047 of the 37,778 eligible voters cast their votes, the turnout rate was 26.6 per cent, slightly better than the previous election in 1969.

Cecilia Yeung of the Reform Club of Hong Kong won the seat onto the Urban Council, becoming the first Chinese woman ever elected to this Council, edging out incumbent Solomon Rafeek with a margin of 139 votes. Elsie Elliott, who was dubbed as the "Queen of the Polls", led the field of ten candidates with 7,578 votes, topping her 1967 record by more than 500 votes.

Outcome

Citations

References
 Lau, Y.W. (2002). A history of the municipal councils of Hong Kong : 1883-1999 : from the Sanitary Board to the Urban Council and the Regional Council. Leisure and Cultural Service Dept. 
 Pepper, Suzanne (2008). Keeping Democracy at Bay:Hong Kong and the Challenge of Chinese Political Reform. Rowman & Littlefield.

Hong Kong
1971 in Hong Kong
Urban
March 1971 events in Asia
1971 elections in the British Empire